Ayesha Bano is a Pakistani politician. Since August 2018, she has been a member of the Provincial Assembly of Khyber Pakhtunkhwa. She has been a president of PTI Women Wing Peshawar Region. She was born on 24 January 1977. She graduated Law in 2002.

Political career
She was elected to the Provincial Assembly of Khyber Pakhtunkhwa as a candidate of Pakistan Tehreek-e-Insaf (PTI) on a reserved seat for women in 2018 Pakistani general election.

References

Living people
Pakistan Tehreek-e-Insaf MPAs (Khyber Pakhtunkhwa)
Politicians from Khyber Pakhtunkhwa
Women members of the Provincial Assembly of Khyber Pakhtunkhwa
1977 births